The Isaiah David Hart Bridge is a truss bridge that spans the St. Johns River in Jacksonville, Florida. It carries U.S. Route 1 Alternate (US 1 Alt.) and State Road 228 (SR 228). It is named after Isaiah Hart, the founder of Jacksonville. It was designed by Sverdrup & Parcel.

History
The Isaiah David Hart Bridge was completed in 1967 at a cost of $8.83 million. The official name of the bridge is the Isaiah David Hart Bridge after the founder of Jacksonville, Isaiah Hart. The bridge was built on a bond to be paid off with tolls until they were lifted in 1989. The bridge helped relieve congestion from the Mathews Bridge and the Main Street Bridge. In 1999 the Hart Bridge was ranked 19th as one of the longest cantilever bridges in the world.

Details
 
The bridge has traditionally been painted green and is often referred to as "The Green Monster" by locals. Daily traffic averages 52,000 vehicles. The stretch of highway between downtown and Beach Boulevard is known as the Commodore Point Expressway, but more commonly referred to by locals as the Hart Bridge Expressway.

The bridge is a steel cantilever bridge which is a type of continuous truss bridge. The bridge's main span is uncommon for a cantilever bridge in that the truss over the main channel tapers upward and the roadway below is suspended from the truss by steel hangers.

Gallery

See also
 
 
 
 List of crossings of the St. Johns River

References

External links

 
City of Jacksonville article about the bridges

Bridges in Jacksonville, Florida
Bridges over the St. Johns River
Road bridges in Florida
Steel bridges in the United States
Continuous truss bridges in the United States
Bridges completed in 1967
Former toll bridges in Florida
Southside, Jacksonville
U.S. Route 1
Bridges of the United States Numbered Highway System
1967 establishments in Florida
Cantilever bridges in the United States